Mac Domangairt is a Scottish surname. Notable people with the surname include:

 Comgall mac Domangairt (6th century), king of Dál Riata
 Eochaid mac Domangairt (died ca. 697), king of Dál Riata (modern western Scotland)
 Gabrán mac Domangairt (6th century), king of Dál Riata